Belkhodja is a surname. Notable people with the surname include:

Asma Belkhodja (1930–2011), Pioneer of the Tunisian feminist movement
Catherine Belkhodja (born 1955), French artist, actress and film director
Hassen Belkhodja (1916–1981), Tunisian politician and businessman
Jeanine Belkhodja (1928-2013), Algerian physician
Néjib Belkhodja (1933– 2007), Tunisian painter
Slim Belkhodja (born 1962), Tunisian chess Grandmaster

References